The Elite 10, known as the Princess Auto Elite 10 for sponsorship reasons, was a curling bonspiel, held as part of the Grand Slam of Curling series. First held in the 2014–15 curling season, it was played between ten top-ranked teams, and utilized a match play system. 

The event was dropped from the Grand Slam calendar for the 2019–20 curling season.

Format
Instead of normal curling scoring rules, the Elite 10 used a match play system in which scoring is based on ends won, rather than rocks scored. An end is won by stealing or scoring two with the hammer, similar to skins curling. Unlike skins, however, there are no carry-overs. In the event of a tie, a draw to the button competition is held to determine the winner. In the standings, wins are worth three points, draw to the button wins are worth two points, and draw to the button losses are worth one point.

Past champions

Men

Women

References

External links

Former Grand Slam (curling) events
Annual sporting events in Canada
Recurring sporting events established in 2015
2015 establishments in Canada